One Time, One Night is the second studio album by American country music duo Sweethearts of the Rodeo, released in 1988 via Columbia Records. The album includes "Satisfy You" and "Blue to the Bone," which both hit #5 on the Billboard Hot Country Singles chart. A cover of the Beatles's "I Feel Fine" rose to #9, while "If I Never See Midnight Again" could only manage a #39 ranking. Other notable tunes include "You Never Talk Sweet" and a cover of an Everly Brothers song, "So Sad (To Watch Good Love Go Bad)."

Track listing

Personnel

Sweethearts of the Rodeo
Kristine Arnold – vocals
Janis Gill – vocals, acoustic guitar

Musicians
Instruments uncredited in liner notes
Eddie Bayers – drums
Barry Beckett – keyboards
Richard Bennett – electric guitar
Steve Buckingham – acoustic guitar
Dennis Burnside – keyboards
Larry Byrom – electric guitar
Rodney Crowell – background vocals
Paul Franklin – steel guitar
Steve Gibson – acoustic guitar
Vince Gill – background vocals
David Hungate – bass guitar
Roy Huskey, Jr. – upright bass
Randy McCormick – keyboards
Augie Meyers – keyboards
Joey Miskulin – accordion
Farrell Morris – Percussion
Mark O'Connor – fiddle
Tom Robb – bass guitar 
Ricky Skaggs – mandolin
Harry Stinson – drums
Billy Joe Walker, Jr. – electric guitar
Pete Wasner – keyboards

Charts

Weekly charts

Year-end charts

References

Sweethearts of the Rodeo albums
1988 albums
Columbia Records albums
Albums produced by Steve Buckingham (record producer)